Kong Su-chang (born 1961) is a South Korean film director and screenwriter. Kong started as a screenwriter and is behind hits such as White Badge (1992), The Ring Virus (1999) and Tell Me Something (1999). He debuted with the military-themed R-Point (2004), and then The Guard Post in 2008.

Career 
Born in 1961, Kong Su-chang graduated from the Korean Literature Department at Hanyang University. Upon graduating, he joined 'Jang San Got Mae', an independent film union and wrote screenplays, such as O Dreamland (1989) and The Night Before the Strike (1990).

Kong is known as a talented screenwriter of thriller and war movies, such White Badge (1992), The Ring Virus (1999) and Tell Me Something (1999). His adaptation of the novel White Badge: A Novel of Korea by Ahn Jung-hyo into the screenplay for White Badge was acclaimed as the best Vietnam War film in Korea.

His directorial feature debut is the military-themed R-Point (2004), which Kong wanted as an anti-war movie. His second feature, The Guard Post (2008), also military-themed is set at the Demilitarized Zone between North and South Korea.

Filmography

Film 
O Dreamland (1989) - screenwriter
The Night Before the Strike (1990) - screenwriter
White Badge (1992) - script editor
No Emergency Exit (1993) - script editor
A Casual Trip (1994) - screenwriter
Naeireun Woldeukeop (1996) - screenwriter
If It Snows on Christmas (1998) - screenwriter
The Ring Virus (1999) - screenwriter
Dulliui Baenangyeohaeng (short film, 1999) - screenwriter
Tell Me Something (1999) - screenwriter
R-Point (2004) - director, screenwriter, script editor
The Guard Post (2008) - director, screenwriter, producer

Television series 
Coma (2006, OCN) - director, creative director

References

External links 
 
 
 

1961 births
Living people
South Korean film directors
South Korean screenwriters
Hanyang University alumni